Višnje is a village southeast of Col in the Municipality of Ajdovščina in the Littoral region of Slovenia.

References

External links 
Višnje at Geopedia

Populated places in the Municipality of Ajdovščina